Introducing Dorothy Dandridge is a 1999 American biographical drama television film directed by Martha Coolidge from a screenplay by Shonda Rhimes and Scott Abbott, based on the biography Dorothy Dandridge by Earl Mills. Filmed over a span of a few weeks in early 1998, the film stars Halle Berry as actress and singer Dorothy Dandridge and premiered on HBO on August 21, 1999. The teleplay is drawn exclusively from the biography of Dorothy Dandridge by Earl Mills. The original music score was composed by Elmer Bernstein, who had known Dandridge and Otto Preminger.

Cast
 Halle Berry as Dorothy Dandridge
 Wendi Williams provides the singing voice for Dorothy Dandridge
 Brent Spiner as Earl Mills
 Klaus Maria Brandauer as Otto Preminger
 Obba Babatundé as Harold Nicholas
 Loretta Devine as Ruby Dandridge
 Cynda Williams as Vivian Dandridge
 LaTanya Richardson as Auntie
 Tamara Taylor as Geri Branton-Nicholas
 William Atherton as Darryl Zanuck
 D. B. Sweeney as Jack Denison
 Don Gettinger as hotel clerk
 Nicholas Hormann as Oscar emcee
 Sharon Brown as Etta Jones
 Darrian C Ford as Fayard Nicholas
 Andre Carthen as Harry Belafonte
 Jon Mack as Ava Gardner
 Kerri Randles as Marilyn Monroe
 Benjamin Brown as Sidney Poitier
 Tyrone Wade as Lex Barker

Soundtrack
RCA Victor released a soundtrack album on August 10, 1999.

"Your Red Wagon" – Wendi Williams (2:29)
"I Got Rhythm" – Wendi Williams (2:44)
"Hep Hop" – Bill Elliott (3:17)  
"Chattanooga Choo Choo" – Wendi Williams (2:27)    
"Sportsman's Mambo" – Bill Elliott (3:08)
"Somebody" – Wendi Williams (2:33)    
"Twelve Cylinders" – Bill Elliott (3:39)    
"You Do Something to Me" – Wendi Williams (2:19)    
"Zoot Suit for My Sunday Gal" – Wendi Williams (3:28)
"That's All" – Wendi Williams (2:34)    
"Streamliner" – Bill Elliott (3:49)  
"First Telephone" – Elmer Bernstein (2:05)    
"Try Again" – Elmer Bernstein (1:17)    
"No Song" – Elmer Bernstein (1:18) 
"Dorothy" – Elmer Bernstein (2:04)

Awards and nominations
2000 Black Reel Awards
 Best Actress—Halle Berry (won)
 Best Film (won)
 Best Supporting Actor—Obba Babatundé (nominated)
 Best Supporting Actor—Brent Spiner (nominated)

2000 Directors Guild of America
 Outstanding Directorial Achievement in Movies for Television—Martha Coolidge (nominated)

Emmy Awards
 Outstanding Art Direction for a Miniseries, Movie or a Special (won)
 Outstanding Cinematography for a Miniseries, Movie or a Special (won)
 Outstanding Costumes for a Miniseries, Movie or a Special (won)
 Outstanding Hairstyling for a Miniseries, Movie or a Special (won)
 Outstanding Lead Actress in a Miniseries or a Movie—Halle Berry (won)
 Outstanding Choreography (nominated)
 Outstanding Directing for a Miniseries, Movie or a Special—Martha Coolidge (nominated)
 Outstanding Supporting Actor in a Miniseries or a Movie—Klaus Maria Brandauer (nominated) 
 Outstanding Made for Television Movie (nominated)
2000 Golden Globes
 Best Performance by an Actress in a Miniseries or Motion Picture Made for Television—Halle Berry (won)
 Best Miniseries or Motion Picture Made for Television (nominated)
 Best Performance by an Actor in a Supporting Role in a Series, Miniseries or Motion Picture Made for Television—Klaus Maria Brandauer (nominated)

2000 Image Awards
 Outstanding Actress in a Television Movie/Miniseries/Dramatic Special—Halle Berry (won)
 Outstanding Television Movie/Miniseries/Dramatic Special (won)
 Outstanding Actor in a Television Movie/Miniseries/Dramatic Special—Obba Babatundé (nominated)

2000 Screen Actors Guild Awards
 Outstanding Performance by a Female Actor in a Television Movie or Miniseries—Halle Berry (won)

References

External links
 
 

1999 television films
1999 films
1999 drama films
1990s biographical drama films
African-American biographical dramas
American biographical drama films
Biographical films about actors
Biographical films about singers
Films about drugs
Films about race and ethnicity
Films based on biographies
Films directed by Martha Coolidge
Films scored by Elmer Bernstein
Films set in the 1950s
Films set in 1965
HBO Films films
American drama television films
1990s American films
Films about disability